Debjani may refer to the following people:

Given name
Debjani Chatterjee (born 1952), Indian-born British poet and writer
Debjani Ghosh (born 1988), Bangladeshi born environmental engineer

Surname
Ismael Debjani  (born 1990), Belgian middle-distance runner